Band of Angels is the 1957 film adaptation of the novel.

Band of Angels may also refer to:

 Band of Angels (Investors)
 Band of Angels (novel), 1955 novel by Robert Penn Warren
 "Band of Angels" (Touched by an Angel), 2001
 A Band of Angels, a 1960s British band
 Band of Angels, a band project formed by Elliot Easton and Danny Malone
 Band of Angels, an all-female band who sang "He's Not There"
 Band of Angels, 2005 novel by Witi Ihimaera

See also 
 Angel Band (disambiguation)